Bonab (also Romanized as Bonāb and Benāb) is a village in Ashkara Rural District, Fareghan District, Hajjiabad County, Hormozgan Province, Iran. At the 2006 census, its population was 214, in 52 families.

References 

Populated places in Hajjiabad County